Boigu Island (also known as Malu Kiyay or Malu Kiwai) is the most northerly inhabited island of Queensland and of Australia. It is part of the Top Western group of the Torres Strait Islands, which lie in the Torres Strait separating Cape York Peninsula from the island of New Guinea. Boigu Island is the name of the locality on the island within the Torres Strait Island Region. Boigu is predominantly inhabited by indigenous Torres Strait Islanders.

It is the largest and only inhabited island of the Talbot Islands group.

Language and affiliations
The language of Boigu is that of the Western and Central Islands of the Torres Strait. The specific dialect is Kalau Kawau Ya, also spoken on the islands of Dauan and Saibai. The people of the three islands consider themselves as one people.

Kala Kawaw Ya (also known as Kalaw Kawaw, KKY) is one of the languages of the Torres Strait. Kala Kawaw Ya is the traditional language owned by the Top Western islands of the Torres Strait Island Region.

Geography
It was formed by the accumulation of alluvial sediments deposited by the discharge of nearby New Guinean rivers into the Strait. These sediments built up over time on an old coral platform which rises from the shallow continental shelf, eventually creating the island.

The village of Boigu at the northern end of the island. It is the northernmost settlement of Australia, but the northernmost land is the uninhabited Bramble Cay,  to the east.

Most of the island is subject to extensive periodic flooding, and as a result the community township has been built on the highest ground.

There are a number of smaller islands nearby, including:
 Aubussi Island, also known as Awbuz
 Moegina Kawa
 Sapural Kawa
 Aymermud
 Moimi Island, also known as Moeyim
Boigu Island Airport is on the south-western edge of the village.

History
Boigu was visited by South Sea Islander missionaries of the London Missionary Society, some time after the establishment of a mission on nearby Saibai Island in 1871.

From the 1870s to around 1910, the Boigu, Dauan and Saibai people, along with the neighbouring Papuan peoples, were being harassed by thugeral "warriors" from the Marind-anim, fierce headhunters from what is now southeast South Papua. In literature dealing with the period, these people are generally termed 'Tuger' or 'Tugeri'. Sir William MacGregor, the Lieutenant-Governor of British New Guinea, noted in 1886 that the population was nearly extinct as a result of these raids.  What he did not realise was that at the time the bulk of the population were staying with family on Saibai and Dauan for mutual protection.

According to 2004 Torres Strait Regional Authority (TSRA) figures, its resident population was approximately 340.

Malu Kiwai State School opened on 29 January 1985. In 2007, it was one of 17 schools in the Torres Strait Islands that amalgamated, becoming the Malu Kiwai Campus  of Tagai State College (which has its main campus on Thursday Island).

Ecology
The island is considered part of the New Guinea mangroves ecoregion, a subset of the Australasian realm.

The interior of the island is sparsely vegetated, and mainly swampland. The coast is fringed by mangroves, which act to protect against the island's sand and mud from sea erosion.

It is likely the mangrove regions harbour healthy populations of saltwater crocodile.

The waters surrounding the island are an important habitat for dugongs, a species of sea mammal listed as vulnerable by the IUCN.

Education 
The Malu Kiwai Campus of the Tagai State College is a primary (Early Childhood-6) campus of Tagai State College at School Road.

There is no secondary school on the island. The secondary school campus of Tagai State College is on Thursday Island.

Amenities 

The Torres Strait Island Regional Council operates an Indigenous Knowledge Centre (library) at 66 Chamber Street.  Partnering with the State Library of Queensland on many occasions over the years, and developed in consultation with the Divisional Manager and Elders on island, the IKC has seen the 2013 Culture Love Program, designed around the theme 'War and Church'.  During the project local Elders/Artists were employed to work alongside State Library staff to build their skills in developing and delivering creative arts and language workshops with children and young people in their communities.

With its close proximity to Papua New Guinea, each weekday PNG island traders travel 45 minutes by boat to Boigu Island to sell their products. 

Boigu Island Primary Health Care Centre is operated by Queensland Health on Chamber Street.

Boigu Island Sewage Treatment Plant is on the western edge of the village on the Esplanade.

See also
List of Torres Strait Islands
Torres Strait Islands#Climate change

References

External links 
 Community History Boigu Community History
 Boigu Island Traders video, State Library of Queensland. Short video on Papua New Guinea traders who visit Boigu Island on a weekly basis to trade goods
 Border Ties: Papua New Guinea and Torres Strait Islands, State Library of Queensland. Digital story on Papa New Guinea's impact on Saibai and Boigu Islands in the Torres Strait

Torres Strait Islands
Torres Strait Islands communities
Aboriginal communities in Queensland
Torres Strait Island Region
Islands of Far North Queensland
Localities in Queensland
Towns in Queensland